WTMG (Magic 101.3) is a commercial radio station in Williston, Florida, broadcasting to the Gainesville-Ocala, Florida area on 101.3 FM.

WTMG has been in its current format since 1994, playing Hip Hop, R&B, Old School and Classic Soul and Gospel.  At first, it was Gainesville's only Urban radio station, targeting the Mainstream Urban and Urban Adult Contemporary audiences alike, but has shifted over to a Rhythmic contemporary direction.  It is home to the Rickey Smiley morning show.

History
The station began broadcasting in 1983 at 92.1 on the FM dial as WJRQ, a satellite-fed country station. WJRQ became WLLO ("Willow 92") in 1986, programming beautiful music, and changed its calls to WFEZ the following year following a sale. The format changed back to country music in 1988 due to advertiser difficulty in selling the easy listening format; however, the country format fared no better in ratings or revenue, and later that same year WFEZ transformed into a Rhythmic Contemporary or "Churban" station, playing urban, dance and pop music, under the guidance of Ocala-Gainesville radio veteran Tony Downes, at the direction of station general manager Mark Tillery, and took the name "Hot 92.1." Hot 92.1 was a ratings success and paved the way for the current urban format which took to the air in the early 1990s; the station adopted the WTMG calls in 1996 and moved to 101.3 FM. By 2009 WTMG began to evolve to a Rhythmic direction with a heavy emphasis on hit-driven Hip-Hop/R&B. Because of this shift, Nielsen BDS placed the station on the Rhythmic Airplay panel.

External links
Official Website
92.1 & 101.3 FM history at Central Florida Radio

TMG
Rhythmic contemporary radio stations in the United States
Radio stations established in 1983
1983 establishments in Florida